Minhe (民和) may refer to the following locations in China:

Minhe Hui and Tu Autonomous County, Qinghai
Minhe Formation, geological formation
Minhe, Jiangxi, town in Jinxian County
Minhe Township, Bin County, Heilongjiang